Frans Reinold Nässling (23 November 1868 – 7 May 1933) was a Finnish sports shooter, who competed at the 1908 and 1920 Summer Olympics, and won three Finnish national championship golds.

Shooting

Olympics

International 

Nässling competed at the 1914 ISSF World Shooting Championships, placing 5th in an army rifle event.

National 

He won three Finnish national championship golds in shooting:
 free rifle, standing: 1908
 free rifle, three positions: 1914, 1918

He represented the club Skjutkonstens Vänner i Åbo.

He was at the constituting meeting of the Finnish Shooting Sport Federation.

Other 

He broke the Finnish national records of 40 and 80 kilometre cycling in 1895.

He was a gymnast in the club Åbo Turnförening his youth.

He was active in the Turku White Guard.

His family name has also appeared as Näsling. Olympic shooter Emil Nässling was his brother.

Sources

References

External links 
 

1868 births
1933 deaths
Finnish male sport shooters
Olympic shooters of Finland
Shooters at the 1908 Summer Olympics
Shooters at the 1920 Summer Olympics
Sportspeople from Turku